This is a list of notable Japanese people.

To be included in this list, the person must have a Wikipedia article showing they are Japanese.

Architects

Artists

Athletes

Authors

 Kobo Abe, author of The Woman in the Dunes
 Ryunosuke Akutagawa
 Matsuo Basho, author of The Narrow Road to the Deep North
 Osamu Dazai, author of No Longer Human
 Yasunari Kawabata, winner of the Nobel Prize in Literature
 Yukio Mishima
 Haruki Murakami
 Kenzaburo Oe, winner of the Nobel Prize in Literature
 Murasaki Shikibu, author of The Tale of Genji
 Sei Shonagon, author of The Pillow Book
 Natsume Soseki, author of Kokoro
 Junichiro Tanizaki
 Kenko Yoshida, author of Essays in Idleness

Company founders

Yoshisuke Aikawa (1880–1967), founder of the Nissan Group and Nissan
Takeo Fujisawa (1910–1988), co-founder of the automobile manufacturer Honda 
Hirotoshi Honda, founder of Mugen Motorsports 
Konosuke Matsushita, founder of Panasonic
Soichiro Honda (1906–1991), co-founder of the automobile manufacturer Honda 
Jujiro Matsuda (1875-1952), founder of Mazda automobile company 
Michio Suzuki (1887–1982), founder of Suzuki 
Eiji Toyoda (1913–2013), founder of luxury automobile manufacturer Lexus 
Kiichiro Toyoda (1894–1952), founder of automobile manufacturer Toyota in 1937 
Sakichi Toyoda (1867–1930), founder of Toyota Industries and Toyota Group

Educators

Mori Arinori
Tsunesaburō Makiguchi
Midori Suzuki
Fukuzawa Yukichi
Tsuda Yukio
Kanō Jigorō
Imai Yone

Emperors

Historians
Ienaga Saburō
Kanda Nobuo
Maruyama Masao
Naitō Torajirō
 Ikuhiko Hata
 Shinichi Kitaoka
 Kan Kimura
 Ichirō Inaba
 Naoki Inose

Military leaders

Samurai

A
 Abe Masakatsu
 Adachi Kagemori
 Adams, William (foreign born) 
 Akao Kiyotsuna
 Akechi Mitsuhide
 Akiyama Nobutomo
 Amago Haruhisa
 Amago Yoshihisa
 See also Amago clan
 Ankokuji Ekei
 Aochi Shigetsuna
 Arai Hakuseki
 Araki Murashige
 Arima Kihei
 Asakura Yoshikage
 Azai Hisamasa
 Azai Nagamasa
 Azai Sukemasa

B
 Baba Nobufusa
 Bessho Nagaharu

C
 Chōsokabe Morichika
 Chōsokabe Kunichika
 Chōsokabe Motochika
 Chōsokabe Nobuchika
 Collache, Eugène

D
 Date Masamune
 See also Date clan
 Doi Toshikatsu

E
 Endō Naotsune
 Enomoto Takeaki

F
 Fūma Kotarō
 Fuwa Mitsuharu
 Fujiwara no Hidesato (Tawara no Tōda)
 Fukushima Masanori

G
 Gamō Katahide
 Gamō Ujisato

H
 Hasekura Tsunenaga
 Hattori Hanzō
 Hatano Hideharu
 Hirate Masahide
 Hitotsubashi Keiki
 Hōjō Masako
 Hōjō Tokimune
 Hōjō Ujiyasu
 Hōjō Ujimasa
 Honda Tadakatsu
 Honda Komatsu (Inahime)
 Honganji Kennyo
 Hosokawa Fujitaka
 Hosokawa Gracia
 Hosokawa Tadaoki
 Hotta Masatoshi

I
 Ii Naomasa
 Ii Naomori
 Ii Naosuke
 Ii Naotaka
 Ii Naoyuki
 Iizasa Ienao
 Ijuin Tada'aki
 Imagawa Yoshimoto
 Imai Kanehira
 Ishida Mitsunari
 Itagaki Nobukata
 Itagaki Taisuke
 Itō Hirobumi
 Iwanari Tomomichi

K
 Kaneko Ietada
 Katagiri Katsumoto
 Katō Kiyomasa
 Kawakami Gensai
 Kido Takayoshi
 Kikkawa Hiroie
 Kimotsuki Kanetsugu
 Kobayakawa Hideaki
 Kobayakawa Hidekane
 Kobayakawa Takakage
 Kojima Toyoharu
 Kuroda Denta
 Kuroda Kanbei Don Sim(e)on Josui Yoshitaka
 Kuroda Kiyotaka
 Kusunoki Masashige
 Kumagai Naozane

M
 Maeda Keiji
 Maeda Nagatane
 Maeda Toshiie
 Maeda Toshinaga
 Maeda Toshitsune
 Manabe Akifusa
 Matsudaira Nobutsuna
 Matsudaira Nobuyasu
 Matsudaira Higo no Kami Katamori
 Matsudaira Sadanobu
 Matsudaira Tadayoshi
 Matsudaira Teru
 Matsunaga Hisahide
 Matsuo Bashō
 Matsudaira Motoyasu
 Minamoto no Mitsunaka
 Minamoto no Yoshiie
 Minamoto no Yoshimitsu
 Minamoto no Yoshinaka
 Minamoto no Yoshitomo
 Minamoto no Yoshitsune
 Minamoto no Tameyoshi
 Minamoto no Yorimasa
 Minamoto no Yorimitsu
 Minamoto no Yoritomo
 Minamoto no Noriyori
 Mirei Kiritani
 Miura Anjin
 Miura Yoshimoto
 Miyamoto Musashi
 Miyoshi Chōkei
 Miyoshi Yoshitsugu
 Mizuno Tadakuni
 Mōri Motonari
 Mori Nagayoshi
 Mōri Okimoto
 Mori Ranmaru
 Mōri Takamoto
 Mōri Terumoto
 Mori Yoshinari

N
 Nagakura Shinpachi
 Nagao Harukage
 Nagao Masakage
 Nagao Tamekage
 Naoe Kanetsugu
 Nakagawa Kiyohide
 Naoe Kagetsuna
 Naoe Kanetsugu
 Nihonmatsu Yoshitsugu
 Niimi Nishiki
 Niiro Tadamoto
 Niwa Nagahide
 Niwa Nagashige

O
 Oda Nobuhide
 Oda Nobunaga
 Oda Nobutada
 Oda Nobutomo
 Oda Nobukatsu
 Ogasawara Shōsai
 Ōishi Kuranosuke
 Okada Izō
 Judge Ōoka
 Ōta Dōkan
 Ōtomo Sōrin
 Okita Sōji
 Ōkubo Toshimichi
 Ōuchi Yoshitaka

R
 Rokkaku Yoshitaka
 Rusu Masakage
 Ryūzōji Takanobu
 See also Ryūzōji clan

S
 Saigo Kiyokazu
 Sagara Taketō
 Saigō Takamori
 Saigō Yoshikatsu
 Saitō Dōsan
 Saitō Hajime
 Saitō Yoshitatsu
 Sakai Tadakiyo
 Sakai Tadashige
 Sakai Tadayo
 Sakamoto Ryōma
 Sakuma Morimasa
 Sakuma Nobumori
 Sanada Masayuki
 Sanada Nobuyuki
 Sanada Yukimura
 Sasaki Kojirō
 Sasaki Yoshikiyo
 Serizawa Kamo
 Shibata Katsuie
 Shima Sakon
 Shimada Ichirō
 Shimazu Katsuhisa
 Shimazu Tadahisa
 Shimazu Tadatsune
 Shimazu Tadayoshi
 Shimazu Takahisa
 Shimazu Yoshihiro
 Shimazu Yoshihisa
 Sue Yoshitaka

T
 Tachibana Muneshige
 Tachibana Dōsetsu
 Tachibana Ginchiyo
 Taigen Sessai
 Taira no Kiyomori
 Taira no Masakado
 Takahashi Shigetane
 Takenaka Shigeharu
 Takaoka Muneyasu
 Takasugi Shinsaku
 Takayama Justo (Shigetomo)
 Takayama Ukon
 Takechi Hanpeita
 Takeda Katsuyori
 Takeda Nobushige
 Takeda Shingen
 Tani Tateki
 Toki Yorinari
 Tokugawa Ieyasu
 Tokugawa Hidetada
 Tokugawa Nariaki
 Tokugawa Yoshinobu
 Toyotomi Hideyoshi
 Toyotomi Hideyori
 Tozuka Tadaharu
 Tsukahara Bokuden

U
 Uesugi Kagekatsu
 Uesugi Kagetora
 Uesugi Kenshin
 Ukita Naoie
 Umezawa Michiharu
 Usami Sadamitsu

W
 Watanabe Kazan
 Watanabe no Tsuna

Y
 Yagyū Jūbei Mitsuyoshi
 Yasuke (foreign born)
 Yamada Arinaga
 Yamada Arinobu
 Yamada Nagamasa
 Yamagata Masakage
 Yamanami Keisuke
 Yanagisawa Yoshiyasu
 Yonekura Shigetsugu
 Yagyū Munenori
 Yamauchi Kazutoyo
 Yūki Hideyasu

Kamakura shōguns

 Minamoto no Yoritomo, r. 1192–1199
 Minamoto no Yoriie, r. 1202–1203
 Minamoto no Sanetomo, r. 1203–1219
 Kujō Yoritsune, r. 1226–1244
 Kujō Yoritsugu, r. 1244–1252
 Prince Munetaka, r. 1252–1266
 Prince Koreyasu, r. 1266–1289
 Prince Hisaakira, r. 1289–1308
 Prince Morikuni, r. 1308–1333
 Prince Morinaga, r.1333–1334
 Prince Norinaga, r. 1334–1338

Kamakura shikken

 Hōjō Tokimasa, r. 1203–1205
 Hōjō Yoshitoki, r. 1205–1224
 Hōjō Yasutoki, r. 1224–1242
 Hōjō Tsunetoki, r. 1242–1246
 Hōjō Tokiyori, r. 1246–1256
 Hōjō Tokimune, r. 1268–1284
 Hōjō Sadatoki, r. 1284–1301
 Hōjō Morotoki, r. 1301–1311
 Hōjō Takatoki, r. 1316–1326

Ashikaga shōguns
 Ashikaga Takauji, ruled 1338–1358
 Ashikaga Yoshiakira, r. 1359–1368
 Ashikaga Yoshimitsu, r. 1368–1394
 Ashikaga Yoshimochi, r. 1395–1423
 Ashikaga Yoshikazu, r. 1423–1425
 Ashikaga Yoshinori, r. 1429–1441
 Ashikaga Yoshikatsu, r. 1442–1443
 Ashikaga Yoshimasa, r. 1449–1473
 Ashikaga Yoshihisa, r. 1474–1489
 Ashikaga Yoshitane, r. 1490–1493, 1508–1521
 Ashikaga Yoshizumi, r. 1494–1508
 Ashikaga Yoshiharu, r. 1521–1546
 Ashikaga Yoshiteru, r. 1546–1565
 Ashikaga Yoshihide, r. 1568
 Ashikaga Yoshiaki, r. 1568–1573

Tokugawa shōguns

Over the course of the Edo period, influential relatives of the shōgun included:
 Tokugawa Mitsukuni of the Mito domain
 Tokugawa Nariaki of the Mito domain
 Tokugawa Mochiharu of the Hitotsubashi branch
 Tokugawa Munetake of the Tayasu branch.
 Matsudaira Katamori of the Aizu branch.
 Matsudaira Sadanobu, born into the Tayasu branch, adopted into the Hisamatsu-Matsudaira of Shirakawa.

Pre-modern

Emperors
Emperor Jinmu
Emperor Kōbun
Emperor Tenmu
Emperor Go-Toba
Emperor Go-Daigo

Commanders from loyal family
Kibitsuhiko-no-mikoto
Yamato Takeru
Empress Jingū

Commanders in Thirty-Eight Years' War
Ōtomo no Otomaro
Sakanoue no Tamuramaro
Aterui

Modern
Anami Korechika
Doihara Kenji
Enomoto Takeaki
Kuroki Itei (Kuroki Tamemoto)
Matsui Iwane
Ōta Minoru
Suzuki Kantarō
Tōgō Heihachirō
Tōjō Hideki
Yamamoto Isoroku
Shiro Kawase
Ishiwara Kanji

Musicians

Personalities

Comedians

Idols (male)

Idols (female)

Models

Musicians and singers (male)

Musicians and singers (female)

Tarento
Aya Ueto
Becky
Kazushige Nagashima
Kano sisters
Matt Kuwata
Mina Fukui
Momoiro Clover Z
Naomi Watanabe
Roland (Japanese host)

Actors

Actresses

TV and radio personalities
Iijima Ai
Mao Inoue
Kano sisters
Sugita Kaoru
Mino Monta
Shinohara Tomoe

Others
Kurihara Harumi
Ghib Ojisan
Papaya Suzuki

Politicians

Prime Ministers

Prime Ministers during the Meiji period (1868–1912)

Under the Meiji Emperor

Prime Ministers during the Taishō period (1912–1926)

Under the Taishō Emperor

Prime Ministers during the Shōwa period (1926–1947)

Under the Shōwa Emperor

Prime Ministers during the Shōwa period (1947–1989)

Under the Emperor Shōwa

Prime Ministers during the Heisei period (1989–present)

Under the Emperor Akihito

Politicians

Religious leaders

Scientists

Mathematicians

Economists

Other notables

Other Japanese

See also
List of people by nationality

References